The Tenasserim–South Thailand semi-evergreen rain forests are a tropical moist forest ecoregion in Southeast Asia. The ecoregion extends north–south along the Kra Isthmus. It includes lowland forests along the coasts, and montane forests in the Tenasserim Hills and Bilauktaung range, which form the mountainous spine of the isthmus.

Geography
In the northern portion of the ecoregion, it is bounded by other tropical forest ecoregions in the coastal lowlands – the Myanmar coastal rain forests along the Andaman Sea to the west, and the Chao Phraya lowland moist deciduous forests to the east along the Gulf of Thailand. In its southern portion the ecoregion extends all the way to the coast. On the south it is bounded by the Peninsular Malaysian rain forests ecoregion.

Flora
Dipterocarps are the dominant trees, and species vary with elevation and latitude. Semi-evergreen trees that lose some of their leaves during the dry season are common in the lowlands, and evergreen trees are predominant in the montane forests.

The Kangar-Pattani floristic boundary forms the southern end of the ecoregion, and marks the boundary between the mostly deciduous and semi-evergreen forests of Indochina and the mostly evergreen forests of Sundaland and Malesia. South of the boundary rainfall becomes more year-round without as pronounced a dry season.

Fauna
The ecoregion's extensive areas of intact forests support some large mammals, include the Asian elephant (Elephas maximus), tiger (Panthera tigris), gaur (Bos gaurus), banteng (Bos javanicus), sun bear (Helarctos malayanus), leopard (Panthera pardus), clouded leopard (Pardofelis nebulosa), and binturong (Arctictis binturong).

The ecoregion is home to 560 species of birds, including one endemic species, Gurney's pitta (Pitta gurneyi).

Conservation
A 2017 assessment found that 21,105 km², or 22%, of the ecoregion is in protected areas. Another 72% of the ecoregion is forested but outside protected areas. Protected areas include Ao Phang Nga National Park, Kaeng Krachan National Park, Kaeng Krung National Park, Khao Pu-Khao Ya National Park, Khao Sok National Park, Lenya National Park, Mu Ko Phetra National Park, Tai Romyen National Park, Tanintharyi National Park, Tarutao National Park, and Thale Ban National Park in Thailand.

References

External links 

Ecoregions of Asia
Ecoregions of Malaysia
Ecoregions of Myanmar
Ecoregions of Thailand

Indomalayan ecoregions
Montane forests
Tropical and subtropical moist broadleaf forests